{{DISPLAYTITLE:C16H20N4O2}}
The molecular formula C16H20N4O2 (molar mass: 300.36 g/mol, exact mass: 300.1586 u) may refer to:

 Azapropazone
 BIA 10-2474

Molecular formulas